Khodadad Azizi (born 22 June 1971) is an Iranian football coach and former player who played as a striker.

Club career
After playing for a few clubs in Iran and following his performance in Asia, he moved to Germany in 1997 to play for 1. FC Köln. Azizi, along with his Iranian national teammates Ali Daei and Karim Bagheri, were among the first Iranians to enter the Bundesliga.

Having played for three seasons in 1. FC Köln, he signed a contract with California-based club San Jose Earthquakes, became the second Iranian player to play in the United States' Major League Soccer. In 2001, Khodadad Azizi was transferred to the United Arab Emirates club Al Nasr, before returning to Iran and joining Pas Tehran.

In 2005, he signed for Admira Wacker in the Austrian Bundesliga. He returned to Iran soon after and signed for lower division club, Oghab. His stay there was not very lengthy as he signed for Rah Ahan in late 2005.

After the 2005–06 season, Azizi retired from club and international football. He finished his international career with 47 caps and 11 goals. Following his retirement, Azizi was employed by his hometown club, Aboomoslem, as club chairman advisor. Azizi also co-owns a sports clothing label called Majid with financial backing from Abdol Majid Saedifar who put a $400,000 into the company. In September 2011, Khabaronline.ir reported Azizi to be the owner of Siah Jamegaan of Khorasaan, a spin-off of F.C. Aboomoslem.

International career
Azizi represented Iran at the 1996 Asian Cup, 1998 FIFA World Cup, and the 2000 Asian Cup. He was named Asian Player of the Year in 1996, as well as the Asian Cup Most Valuable Player in the 1996 Asian Cup.

Azizi is best remembered for scoring the equaliser against Australia in the second leg World Cup qualifier in November 1997, sending Iran into France 98.

Coaching career
In December 2006, Azizi was appointed the manager of Aboomoslem, a Mashhad based football club that he had started his career with in the early 1990s. He was replaced by Parviz Mazloumi in October 2007. He was head coach of Payam Khorasan and Esteghlal Ahvaz for a short time. In 2011, he was appointed as head coach of Aboomoslem for a second time but parted company with the club on 1 June 2012.

Career statistics

Club

International
Scores and results list Iran's goal tally first, score column indicates score after each Azizi goal.

Honours
Persepolis 
Asian Club Championship: third place 1996–97

1. FC Köln

2. Bundesliga: 1999–2000
Pas

Iran Pro League: 2003–04

Individual
AFC Player of the Year: 1996
AFC Asian Cup Most Valuable Player: 1996

References

External links

Khodadad Azizi at TeamMelli.com

1971 births
Living people
Iranian footballers
Iran international footballers
Iranian expatriate footballers
Iranian football managers
Association football forwards
F.C. Aboomoslem players
Persepolis F.C. players
1996 AFC Asian Cup players
1998 FIFA World Cup players
2000 AFC Asian Cup players
Bahman players
1. FC Köln players
FC Admira Wacker Mödling players
Al-Nasr SC (Dubai) players
San Jose Earthquakes players
Pas players
Rah Ahan players
Bundesliga players
2. Bundesliga players
Asian Footballer of the Year winners
Major League Soccer players
Major League Soccer All-Stars
UAE Pro League players
Expatriate footballers in Germany
Expatriate soccer players in the United States
Expatriate footballers in the United Arab Emirates
Expatriate footballers in Austria
Iranian expatriate sportspeople in Germany
Iranian expatriate sportspeople in the United States
Iranian expatriate sportspeople in the United Arab Emirates
Iranian expatriate sportspeople in Austria